Edwin George Perlmutter (born May 1, 1953) is an American lawyer and politician who served as the U.S. representative for  from 2007 to 2023. A member of the Democratic Party, his district was located in the northern and western suburbs of the Denver metropolitan area. He previously served as the Colorado state senator from the 20th district from 1995 to 2003. On January 10, 2022, he announced he would not seek re-election in 2022.

Early life, education, and career
Perlmutter was born in Denver, the son of Alice Love (née Bristow) and Leonard Michael Perlmutter on May 1, 1953. His father was Jewish, the son of immigrants from Poland; his mother was Christian, and was of English and Irish descent. Perlmutter describes himself as a Christian. Perlmutter graduated from Jefferson High School in Edgewater, Colorado and went on to graduate from the University of Colorado at Boulder in 1975. He received his Juris Doctor at Colorado in 1978.

Colorado Senate
Perlmutter was a Colorado State Senator from 1995 to 2003. He was elected to two four-year terms to represent central Jefferson County as State Senator from 1995 to 2003—the first Democrat elected in the district in 30 years.

He has assisted numerous campaigns and in was co-chair of the John Kerry 2004 presidential campaign in Colorado.

U.S. House of Representatives

Committee assignments

 Committee on Financial Services
 Subcommittee on National Security, International Development and Monetary Policy
 Subcommittee on Oversight and Investigations
 United States House Committee on Science, Space and Technology
 Subcommittee on Energy
 Subcommittee on Space
 United States House Committee on Rules
 Select Committee on the Modernization of Congress

Caucus memberships
New Democrat Coalition
Aerospace Caucus
Cannabis Caucus
Gun Violence Prevention Task Force
Equality Caucus
Labor Caucus
NASA Caucus
National Parks Caucus
National Wildlife Refuge Caucus
Olympic and Paralympic Caucus
Pro-Choice Caucus
Science and National Labs Caucus
Sustainable Energy and Environment Caucus
Climate Solutions Caucus

Secure and Fair Enforcement (SAFE) Banking Act
Since 2013, Perlmutter and Rep. Denny Heck have introduced legislation to improve access to banking and financial services for cannabis businesses. Initially known as the Marijuana Business Access to Banking Act, it was rebranded as the Secure and Fair Enforcement (SAFE) Banking Act in 2017. On September 25, 2019, the House of Representatives passed the SAFE Banking Act by a 321–103 vote, marking the first time that a standalone cannabis reform bill had passed either chamber of Congress.

Political campaigns

2006

Perlmutter won the Democratic nomination for the 7th district by defeating former State Representative Peggy Lamm and college professor Herb Rubenstein, with 53% of the vote in the primary. State education chairman Rick O'Donnell was unopposed for the Republican nomination. Dave Chandler, a Green, was also a candidate.

The seat was held by Republican Bob Beauprez, who was reelected to a second term in 2004 with 55% of the vote, after winning his first term by only 121 votes. He left the seat at the end of the 2004–2006 term, having failed in his bid to become Governor of Colorado.

In late September, O'Donnell was put on the defensive when ads appeared noting that he had previously supported abolishing Social Security. A Survey USA poll soon after that showed Perlmutter with a 54 to 37 percent lead, although GOP consultants guessed that the support was "soft". An October 4 poll released by Zogby showed Perlmutter ahead of O'Donnell by 45-34 percent. Cook Political Report rating: Republican Toss Up. CQPolitics rating: No Clear Favorite.

In the end, Perlmutter (54%) soundly defeated O'Donnell (42%) for the congressional seat, helping Democrats to regain the majority in the U.S. House.

2008

Perlmutter won against Republican nominee John W. Lerew.

2010

Perlmutter defeated Republican nominee Ryan Frazier and Libertarian nominee Buck Bailey on November 2, 2010. The 7th Congressional district had been cited as a GOP target in 2010.

2012

Perlmutter defeated Republican nominee Joe Coors Jr. on November 6, 2012. Perlmutter's victory came despite new congressional boundaries that made his district 4 percent less Democratic.  Perlmutter was ahead by 9 percentage points in Jefferson County, where 60 percent of the voters live.  Perlmutter led Coors by 17 percentage points in Adams County, where 40 percent of the constituents in the newly drawn 7th district live.

2014

Perlmutter defeated Republican nominee Don Ytterberg in the 2014 general election. He won with 55.1% of the vote.

2016

Perlmutter defeated Republican nominee George Athanasopoulos and Libertarian nominee Martin L. Buchanan in the 2016 general election. He won with 55.18% of the vote.

2018

On April 9, 2017, Perlmutter announced his candidacy for Governor of Colorado in the 2018 election. On July 10, 2017, Perlmutter announced that he was dropping out of the gubernatorial race and would not seek reelection to his congressional seat. However, on August 21, 2017, he announced he had reversed his decision again and ran for reelection for his congressional seat. He defeated Republican nominee Mark Barrington, winning re-election with 60.42% of the vote.

2020

Perlmutter defeated Republican nominee Casper Stockham, Libertarian nominee Ken Biles, and Unity nominee Dave Olszta in the 2020 general election. He won with 59.1% of the vote.

Personal life
Perlmutter has three children. He and his first wife Deana divorced in 2008. In November 2010, Perlmutter married Nancy Henderson. His uncle was Denver real estate developer Jordon Perlmutter.

References

External links

 U.S. Congressman Ed Perlmutter official U.S. House website
 Perlmutter for Colorado official campaign website

 

|-

|-

1953 births
20th-century Methodists
21st-century American politicians
21st-century Methodists
American people of English descent
American people of Irish descent
American people of Polish-Jewish descent
American United Methodists
Colorado lawyers
Democratic Party members of the United States House of Representatives from Colorado
Democratic Party Colorado state senators
Living people
Politicians from Denver
University of Colorado Boulder alumni